Zak Kennedy Jules (born 7 February 1997) is a Scottish professional footballer who plays as a defender for  club Milton Keynes Dons. He was born in Islington, England, but has represented Scotland at all levels from under-17 to under-21.

He began his career at Reading, from where he was loaned out to Hemel Hempstead Town, Braintree Town and Motherwell. He signed with Shrewsbury Town in June 2017, and spent the 2017–18 season on loan at Chesterfield and Port Vale. He joined Barnet on loan in September 2018, before joining Macclesfield Town after leaving Shrewsbury by mutual consent in January 2019. He signed with Walsall in July 2019, where he stayed for 18 months before being sold on to Milton Keynes Dons. He spent the second half of the 2021–22 season on loan at Fleetwood Town.

Club career

Reading
Jules came through the Academy at Reading, and on 31 October 2015 was sent on loan to National League South club Hemel Hempstead Town. He made his debut for the club on 31 October, in a 6–2 victory at Gosport Borough. He made a further seven appearances for Dean Brennan's "Tudors", before he returned to the Madejski Stadium on 4 January 2016. He later said that the loan spell "toughened me up a bit". He signed an extension to his professional contract at Reading at the end of the 2015–16 season.

On 2 December 2016, Jules joined Braintree Town on a month-long loan deal. He played in three National League matches during his time at Cressing Road, and also featured in two cup games. Back at Reading, he reported that he had been working closely with "Royals" head coach Jaap Stam, who told him to be more aggressive. On 27 January 2017, Jules joined Scottish Premiership club Motherwell on loan until the end of the 2016–17 season. He endured a difficult start to his time at Fir Park as he conceded a penalty in the 2–0 defeat at Celtic and scored an own goal in the 5–1 home defeat by Dundee that preceded manager Mark McGhee's departure from the club. He did though score the winning goal in a 2–1 victory at Kilmarnock on 4 March, in what was new manager Stephen Robinson's first game in charge. However, on 6 May, an error by Jules gifted Ross County a 1–0 win at Fir Park that sent the "Steelmen" into the relegation play-off zone with three matches left to play.

Shrewsbury Town
On 25 June 2017, Jules signed a two-year contract with League One club Shrewsbury Town. He scored in a pre-season friendly with Aston Villa at the New Meadow, though "Shrews" manager Paul Hurst said that "he's a player that we feel needs a lot of work". On 31 August 2017, Jules joined Gary Caldwell's League Two side Chesterfield on loan until 14 January 2018. He made his debut two days later in a 0–0 draw with Coventry City at the Proact Stadium. However he tore 90% of his hamstring during his sixth appearance for the "Spireites" on 26 September and was forced to return to Shrewsbury for a lengthy rehabilitation period. However he was unable to win a first-team place at Shrewsbury due to the team's good form and excellent defensive record. On 19 January 2018, he returned to League Two after joining Port Vale on loan until the end of the 2017–18 season. He began as the "Valiants" first-choice left-back, but struggled for form and was substituted after 51 minutes of his second appearance at Vale Park by manager Neil Aspin.

On 21 September 2018, Jules returned to the National League on a three-month loan at Barnet after failing to figure in new Shrewsbury manager John Askey's first-team plans. Jules made five appearances for John Still's "Bees", the last of which came in a 4–2 FA Cup victory over Braintree Town on 20 October. Jules left Shrewsbury by mutual consent on 3 January 2019.

Macclesfield Town
On 28 January 2019, Jules signed a short-term deal with League Two relegation-threatened club Macclesfield Town. He went on to become an important part of the Macclesfield defence, featuring 14 times to help the "Silkmen" to avoid relegation at the end of the 2018–19 season. His stay at Moss Rose was extended by a further 12-months after manager Sol Campbell opted to take up an option on his contract.

Walsall
On 27 July 2019, Jules signed a contract of undisclosed-length with newly relegated League two side Walsall after being signed for an undisclosed fee. Manager Darrell Clarke described him as "a young player we want to develop". He began the 2019–20 season in the starting eleven and filled in for an injured Cameron Pring at left-back. However he went almost three months from 19 October with only one league start, and was then taken off at half-time in a 3–1 defeat at Cheltenham Town on 11 January. On 8 September 2020, Jules scored his first goal for the club during a 2–2 home EFL Trophy group stage tie with Bristol Rovers. He became a key player in the first half of the 2020–21 season, filling in at left-back as well as at centre-back. He was reportedly being tracked by a number of higher division clubs.

Milton Keynes Dons
On 1 February 2021, the final day of the January transfer window, Jules joined League One club Milton Keynes Dons for an undisclosed fee. He made his debut at Stadium MK on 6 February in a 2–2 draw with Sunderland, and scored his first goal three days later in a 4–1 win away at Rochdale. He made his debut at wing-back, though manager Russell Martin said he intended to play Jules as part of a back three in the long-term. Jules was indeed moved to the left-side of a back three and said he felt he was adapting well to MK Dons’ unique style of play that demanded confidence on the ball from the backline. He ended the 2020–21 season with 15 starts and five substitute appearances as the Dons posted a 13th-place finish in League One.

On 15 January 2022, following limited first team opportunities at MK Dons under new manager Liam Manning, Jules joined fellow League One club Fleetwood Town on loan for the remainder of the 2021–22 season. He was immediately handed a start by manager Stephen Crainey, and kept a clean sheet in a 1–0 win over Rotherham United at Highbury Stadium. The Blackpool Gazette reported that he "quickly become a key player in the Fleetwood defence". Jules went on to make 20 appearances for Fleetwood, helping the club to finish outside of the relegation zone on goal difference.

International career
Jules was born in Islington, but became eligible to play for Scotland through his mother, who came from Glasgow. He represented the under-17 team and was selected by Scot Gemmill in the Scotland squad for the 2014 UEFA European Under-17 Championship in Malta. The team were knocked out at the semi final stage. He went on to win caps at under-18 and under-19 level, before going on to make his under-21 debut in a 2–0 defeat to Iceland on 5 October 2016. He was selected in the Scotland squad for the 2017 Toulon Tournament in France, and played in the group stage games against the Czech Republic and Indonesia. The team beat the Czech this time to secure the bronze medal. It was the nations first ever medal at the competition.

Style of play
A  central-defender, Jules describes himself as "fast and good on the ball" and has said that "I am quite quick and quite powerful, I have a half-decent left foot and I like to play a bit as well". A left-footed player, he can also fill in at left-back.

Career statistics

References

External links
 
 

1997 births
Living people
Footballers from Islington (district)
Scottish footballers
Scotland youth international footballers
Scotland under-21 international footballers
English footballers
English people of Scottish descent
Black British sportspeople
Association football defenders
Reading F.C. players
Hemel Hempstead Town F.C. players
Braintree Town F.C. players
Motherwell F.C. players
Shrewsbury Town F.C. players
Chesterfield F.C. players
Port Vale F.C. players
Barnet F.C. players
Macclesfield Town F.C. players
Walsall F.C. players
Milton Keynes Dons F.C. players
Fleetwood Town F.C. players
English Football League players
National League (English football) players
Scottish Professional Football League players